The British Rail Class 14 is a type of small diesel-hydraulic locomotive built in the mid-1960s.  Twenty-six of these 0-6-0 locomotives were ordered in January 1963, to be built at British Railways' Swindon Works. The anticipated work for this class was trip working movements between local yards and short-distance freight trains. The good all-around visibility from the cab and dual controls also made them capable of being used for shunting duties. The order was expanded from 26 to 56 in mid-1963, before work had started on the first order. They were numbered D9500-D9555.

Technical details
In July 1964, the first of a class of 56 locomotives appeared from Swindon Works. These were later designated as TOPS Class 14 by British Railways. They are known as 'Teddy Bears' by enthusiasts, following a comment by Swindon Works' erecting shop foreman George Cole who quipped "We've built The Great Bear, now we're going to build a 'Teddy Bear'!"

In outline they have a cab offset from the centre with bonnets at each end,  with a fixed 0-6-0 wheel configuration rather than bogies as seen on all the other Type 1 classes.  The locomotives were powered by a Paxman 6-cylinder Ventura 6YJXL engine with a Napier turbocharger producing , connected to a Voith L217U hydraulic transmission and Hunslet final drive. The axles were connected by coupling rods and driven by a jackshaft located under the cab, between the second and third axles. The plate frames were of 1 inch steel and deep buffer beams almost to rail level. One was of similar thickness to the frames, the other of 5 inch thick steel to act as ballast and to even out weight distribution.

Operations and preservation
Originally all were allocated to depots on the Western Region of British Railways, but in January 1967 twenty were sent to Hull (Dairycoates) on the Eastern Region (ER), followed by thirteen more later the same year. At Hull they were intended for work around the docks, but the tasks were beyond the capabilities of a single locomotive; and since two locomotives required two sets of crew, they were not popular with the region. In 1968, all 33 ER locomotives were placed in storage, and were subsequently withdrawn on 1 April that year.

The Class 14s, like many other early diesel types, had an extremely short life with British Railways – in this case not because of poor reliability, but because many of its envisaged duties disappeared on the BR network a few years after they came into use. BR started to dispose of members of the class from mid 1968, and the entire class had been sold to industry or scrapped by the end of 1970. In their new careers in industry, many had a working life two to three times longer than that with British Railways. The industries in which they were employed, such as coal mining, declined during the 1970s and the class again became surplus to requirements. Several have since found a third lease of life on preserved lines where they are ideal for both light passenger work and with works trains on the maintenance of permanent way.

Unusually, D9504 was leased in 2005 from its preservation group and found itself in revenue-earning service on the newest mainline in the UK – High Speed 1 (known as the Channel Tunnel Rail Link during construction) – mainly in marshalling and stabling the 450 metre, 22-wagon concrete-pumping train on the final stretch to St. Pancras Station.

D9524 was re-engined under the ownership of BP Grangemouth. It was later re-engined again under the ownership of the Scottish RPS who, following BR practice, gave it the number 14901. It now operates with a Rolls-Royce DV8TCE (640 bhp) power unit.

The last of the class to be built, D9555, was the final locomotive constructed for British Railways at Swindon Works, in 1965; today it is privately owned and operates on the Dean Forest Railway, Gloucestershire – its original route.

In July 2014, the East Lancashire Railway hosted ten preserved members of the class as a celebration of the 50 years since their entry into service.

Fleet

Models
Hattons commissioned Danish company Heljan to produce a limited run in OO gauge in three liveries. Since then they have announced plans for further examples, still in limited numbers, but in a wider variety of liveries.

Graham Farish also produces the Class 14 in several liveries in British N scale.

Minerva Model Railways announced the production of a ready-to-run O gauge (7mm Finescale) model in May 2019. Delivery commenced in February 2022 following delays due to incorrect cab colour on the initial supplies.

In 2011 a 7 1/4" gauge model of D9522 won best locomotive and best model in show at the national model engineering exhibition in Harrogate.

References

Further reading

External links

 D9531.com website
 Website covering D9500 and 14901 (D9524)

14
C locomotives
Railway locomotives introduced in 1964
14
Standard gauge locomotives of Great Britain